Consolidated Appropriations Act, 2022 is a $1.5 trillion omnibus spending bill. The bill was passed by Congress on March 14, 2022. The bill was signed into law by President Joe Biden on March 15, 2022. 

The law includes $13.6 billion in aid to Ukraine as part of the United States' response to the 2022 Russian invasion of Ukraine.

Negotiations
One important point of debate for the bill involved how much defense versus non-defense spending would be increased; Republican "leaders demanded equal levels of growth in the two areas." Compared to FY2021, the final bill raised defense spending by 5.6% to $782 billion, and other discretionary funding by 6.7% to $730 billion.

Due to lack of agreement on how much to grant out of the $22.5 billion requested for the ongoing COVID-19 pandemic in the United States, all funding in that area was dropped to allow the bill to pass quickly. The government said this endangered COVID-related testing, treatment, vaccination, international vaccine distribution, and preparedness for future COVID variants.

Contents

The bill includes a reauthorization of the Violence Against Women Act, which had lapsed in 2019.

The bill "includes a ban on the use of any maps by the U.S. Department of State and its foreign operations that 'inaccurately' depict Taiwan as part of China."

The bill amends the definition of the term “tobacco product” under the Family Smoking Prevention and Tobacco Control Act to define a tobacco product as “any product made or derived from tobacco or containing nicotine from any source, that is intended for human consumption." Making electronic vapor products that contain synthetic nicotine subject to Food and Drug Administration (FDA) regulation. The law becomes effective on April 14, 2022, and manufacturers will have until May 14, 2022 to either submit a premarket tobacco product application (PMTA) to the FDA for each of their electronic vapor products that contain synthetic nicotine or stop marketing those products in the marketplace. Manufacturers that do submit a PMTA to the FDA by the May 14, 2022 deadline can continue marketing their products until July 13, 2022, after which time the products must be removed from retail stores unless the FDA has issued a PMTA marketing authorization order by the July 13, 2022 deadline date.

The bill also includes $4.5 million to fund the White House internship program, resulting in White House interns being paid for the first time. This was done following years of controversy surrounding the issue.

 built upon the earlier  concerning reporting to and reporting from the Unidentified Aerial Phenomena Task Force, requiring quarterly classified reporting to Congress beginning no later than 13 June 2022. In July 2022 the All-domain Anomaly Resolution Office (AARO) was (re-)established.

References

External links
 Consolidated Appropriations Act, 2022 as amended (PDF/details) in the GPO Statute Compilations collection
 Consolidated Appropriations Act, 2022 as enacted (PDF/details) in the US Statutes at Large
 C-SPAN video of President Biden signing Consolidated Appropriations Act, 2022 into law
 House Committee on Appropriations: Community Project Funding Transparency (list of earmarks requested and funded)

Acts of the 117th United States Congress
Omnibus legislation
Reactions to the 2022 Russian invasion of Ukraine
Ukraine–United States relations
United States federal appropriations legislation